is a Japanese former professional racing cyclist. He finished second in the Japanese National Road Race Championships in 2008 and 2014, and represented Japan in the 2008 UCI Road World Championships. He has won the elite road race competition at the National Sports Festival of Japan four times.

Major results

2008
 2nd Road race, National Road Championships
2009
 1st Road race, East Asian Games
 6th Kumamoto International Road Race
 8th Overall Tour de Okinawa
2010
 4th Kumamoto International Road Race
2011
 1st Stage 2 Tour de Filipinas
2012
 9th Overall Tour de Hokkaido
2014
 2nd Road race, National Road Championships
2015
 5th Tour de Okinawa

References

External links

1981 births
Living people
Japanese male cyclists
People from Fukui (city)
Sportspeople from Fukui Prefecture